The Note is an album released in the Spring of 2005 by hardcore band Bane. The album consists of a deeper, more mature sound than that of previous albums.

Track listing
 "Woulda, Coulda, Shoulda"  – 2:49 
 "Pot Committed"   – 3:28 
 "One for the Boys"   – 2:07 
 "Hoods Up"   – 2:01 
 "End with an Ellipsis"   – 3:29 
 "My Therapy"   – 2:24 
 "Don't Go"   – 2:37 
 "Wasted on the Young"   – 3:41 
 "What Keeps Us Here"   – 1:42 
 "Swan Song"   – 3:48

Band members
Aaron Bedard - Vocals
Aaron Dalbec - Guitar
Zach Jordan - Guitar (also contributed to production)
Pete Chilton - Bass (also contributed to album art)
Bob Mahoney - Drums

Other contributors
Brian McTernan - Production and engineering
Oliver Chapoy - Additional engineering
David Manganaro - Illustrations

References

External links
Equal Vision Records

Bane (band) albums
2005 albums
Equal Vision Records albums
Albums produced by Brian McTernan